Cherry Green is a hamlet in the East Hertfordshire District, in the county of Hertfordshire, England.  The post town for Cherry Green is the nearby town of Buntingford. It is in the civil parish of Westmill.

External links 

Hamlets in Hertfordshire
East Hertfordshire District